Chandrika Ravi is an Australian actress, model and dancer of Indian origin. She was born and raised in Australia before moving to Los Angeles for her acting and modelling career. She became known for her role in the 2018 Indian film Iruttu Araiyil Murattu Kuththu.

Early life and career 
Chandrika was born in Melbourne to Ravi Sreedharan and Malika Ravi.

She started learning dancing and acting from the age of three, then began her professional career at the age of 16; performing in theatre, film and tv around the world. She has won the runner-up title in 2014 Miss Maxim India and was the first Indian descent woman to place as a finalist in 2012 Miss World Australia and Miss India Australia.

Chandrika Ravi made her Indian film debut after being signed up to acting in the Tamil film, Sei in late 2017 which stars Nakul as male lead. She became known in the Tamil film industry through her performance in the film Iruttu Araiyil Murattu Kuththu, an adult comedy horror, in the role of a ghost. She was a lead actress and has been signed for several project after the film, including Sei and Un Kadhal Irundhal.

Filmography

References

External links 
 
 

1988 births
Living people
Actresses from Melbourne
Australian film actresses
Australian female models
Australian female dancers
Australian people of Malayali descent
Australian people of Tamil descent
Tamil actresses
Australian actresses of Indian descent
Female models of Indian descent
Australian expatriate actresses in the United States
Australian expatriate actresses in India
Actresses in Tamil cinema
Actresses in Telugu cinema
Murdoch University alumni
21st-century Australian actresses